Nita Rousseau (1944 – 28 July 2003, Paris) was a French journalist and woman of letters. The daughter of an officer of the troupes coloniales, Nita Rousseau grew up in Indochina and Africa. She was a documentalist at Le Nouvel Observateur, before becoming a cultural journalist and a literary and theatrical critic from 1971. Her first novel, Les Iris bleus, received the prix Goncourt du premier roman in 1992. L'Italienne and La Pluie sur la mer were devoted to the world of theater. She portrayed her father in her latest book, Un père si mystérieux.

Works 
1991: Un colossal enfant, conversations with Marcel Maréchal, Actes Sud, 
1992: Les Iris bleus, éditions Flammarion, 
1993: L'Italienne, éditions Flammarion, 
1998: La Pluie sur la mer, éditions Flammarion, 
2001: Un père si mystérieux, Plon,

External links 
 Nita Rousseau, journaliste on Le Monde (5 August 2003)
 La mort de Nita Rousseau on L'Obs (8 August 2003)
 Sauf moi, papa on La Libre Belgique (4 April 2001)

1944 births
20th-century French writers
20th-century French women writers
21st-century French writers
French women journalists
French literary critics
French women critics
Women literary critics
20th-century French journalists
Prix Goncourt du Premier Roman recipients
2003 deaths
21st-century French women writers